This is a list of supergroups, music groups whose members are already successful as solo artists or as part of other groups. Usually used in the context of rock bands such as Audioslave and Chickenfoot. The term has been applied to other musical genres such as The Three Tenors in Opera. as well as in R&B/Pop with such popular acts like Bell Biv Devoe (BBD), LSG & TGT, and in Hip Hop with collaborations such as The Firm, Westside Connection and Method Man & Redman.

The term is sometimes applied retrospectively when several members from a group later achieve notable success in their own right. Supergroups are sometimes formed as side projects and thus not intended to be permanent, while other times can become the primary project of the members' careers. Charity supergroups, where prominent musicians perform or record together in support of a particular cause, have been common since the 1980s.

List of groups

Groups with numerous albums and/or live appearances 
This is a list of notable supergroups which have performed or recorded more than a single song/album or live shows together.

Groups with a less single releases/album, live/audio appearances 

These were often one-show or one-album projects or EPs, though some played more than one show or recorded more than one single or EPs, because all or most members were involved in other bands or groups. Some groups listed were also either a collaborative effort as well as created for television specials and/or may have released one project or few singles as well as unite one or few times on an audio recording or live performance appearance.

Charity supergroups

Charity groups are usually one-shot projects, organized to create a charity record to raise money or awareness for a cause or charity. Notable examples are the various charity supergroups which formed in response to the 1983–85 famine in Ethiopia, initiated by Band Aid which recorded "Do They Know It's Christmas?" in 1984, such as USA for Africa ("We Are the World") and Northern Lights ("Tears Are Not Enough"), as well as the 1986 heavy metal project Hear 'n Aid.

Progressive rock supergroups

Progressive rock is a genre of rock music that expands on rock music with influences from jazz, folk, classical, and other styles of music.

References

Lists of bands